Denise Strebig-Haigh (born June 15, 1960) is an American professional golfer who played on the LPGA Tour between 1983 and 1989.

Strebig was born in San Bernardino, California. She played college golf at the University of Southern California. She married tour official Kerry Haigh in 1988.

References

American female golfers
USC Trojans women's golfers
LPGA Tour golfers
Golfers from California
Sportspeople from San Bernardino, California
1960 births
Living people